Charles R. "Bud" Acton (born January 11, 1942 in Troy, Michigan) is an American former basketball player in the National Basketball Association (NBA). He was a 6'6" 210 lbs small forward and played collegiately for Alma College and Hillsdale College.

He played 23 games for the San Diego Rockets in the 1967–68 NBA season.

NBA career statistics

Regular season

|-
| style="text-align:left;"| 
| style="text-align:left;"| San Diego
| 23 || – || 8.5 || .392 || – || .655 || 2.0 || .5 || – || – || 3.3
|- class="sortbottom"
| style="text-align:left;"| Career
| style="text-align:left;"|
| 23 || – || 8.5 || .392 || – || .655 || 2.0 || .5 || – || – || 3.3

References 

1942 births
Living people
Alma Scots men's basketball players
American men's basketball players
Basketball players from Michigan
Hillsdale Chargers men's basketball players
Forwards (basketball)
People from Troy, Michigan
San Diego Rockets players
Small forwards
Undrafted National Basketball Association players